The 2016 Three Rivers District Council election took place on 5 May 2016 to elect members of Three Rivers District Council in England. This was on the same day as other local elections.

Summary Result

Ward Results

Abbots Langley and Bedmond

Carpenders Park

Chorleywood North and Sarratt

Chorleywood South and Maple Cross

Dickinsons

Durrants

Gade Valley

Leavesden

Moor Park and Eastbury

Oxhey Hall and Hayling

Penn and Mill End

Rickmansworth Town

South Oxhey

References

2016 English local elections
2016
2010s in Hertfordshire